This is a timeline of the history of the Kingdom of Champa and its people–the Cham–an Austronesian-speaking ethnic group in Southeast Asia.

Neolithic

Chinese rule

From 3rd to 15th centuries

3rd century

4th century

5th century

6th century

7th century

8th century

9th century

10th century

11th century

12th century

13th century

14th century

15th century

Panduranga–Trấn Thuận Thành

16th century

17th century

18th century

19th century

References

Bibliography

 
 
 
 
  
 
 

,

History of Champa
History of Vietnam
Champa